The progressive Muslim vote refers to the support that the majority of Muslims make in the West for electoral options of the political left. Different demographic and statistical studies have shown a consistent tendency for Muslims in Western countries to vote for progressive parties, usually social democrats, socialists or social liberals. This despite the fact that some Western Muslims tend to be socially conservative, and thus opposed to certain issues often supported by the left such as LGBT rights, feminism, and abortion. This phenomenon has been analyzed by different scholars and academics.

Analysis
For some scholars, despite the differences on cultural and moral issues with the left, and the secularism normally associated with it, Muslims as voters are attracted to progressive parties for different reasons:

 In international politics; progressive governments tend to be closer to Muslim interests such as the Palestinian position in the Israeli–Palestinian conflict and opposition to Middle East interventions such as the Iraq War.
 The left is often more critical or even hostile to Zionism, with some left movements being openly anti-Zionist.
 Most Western Muslims are immigrants, and left and center-left parties tend to be friendlier to immigrants and support more humanistic migration policies.
 The right, especially the far right but also in some cases the more moderate conservative right, have expressed anti-Islamic or Islamophobic positions, or are close to a base of ultra-conservative Christians hostile to Islam, which has alienated Muslim voters who do not have more choice than opting for parties opposed to them on the other side of the spectrum.
 The existence of Islamic socialism and that the ideas and principles of Islam are close to socialism or progressive socioeconomic positions, so many Muslims, although they differ with the cultural liberalism of the left, agree with their economic ideas.

However, some polls have shown that although international issues are important for Muslim voters, they are not decisive since they are more concerned with other things that are closer to home, such as the fight against xenophobia and economic policies.

Rafaela Dancygier from Princeton University mentions that the majority of Muslims in Europe are small business owners and micro-entrepreneurs who would not necessarily agree with left-wing policies such as tax increases and the welfare state, so they would normally be akin to conservative center-right parties, the fact that they are not shows the failure of the center-right to attract the Muslim voter out of fear of alienating its Christian base.

Jonathan Lawrence of Boston College, on the other hand, argues that the left's association with Muslims is natural, since in the West, the majority of Muslims are working-class and of low socioeconomic status, and that the workers' parties have realized this long ago, however, another important base of progressive voters is a liberal, secular and progressive middle class who believe in multiculturalism, secularism, and LGBT and women's rights that are not shared by the majority of Muslims, which has made it difficult for the left to balance these two bases. For on the one hand they must please their more conservative Muslim constituencies and on the other their secular middle-class base.

Nevertheless, as Lawrence points out, this progressivism is paradoxical and does not extend to their views on politics in the Islamic world itself. Although the majority of voters in the Turkish and Tunisian diaspora supported progressive parties in their countries of residence when they cast their vote abroad in the elections in Turkey and Tunisia, they mostly supported conservative parties such as Recep Tayyip Erdoğan's Justice and Development Party in Turkey and the Tunisian Ennahda party respectively.

By region

United States and Canada
In the United States, the majority of Muslims vote for the Democratic Party. Although the distribution between Democrats and Republicans among the non-black Muslim community in the United States used to be more even, with 50% of Muslims defining themselves as conservative and 30% as liberals, this changed after the September 11 attacks and the subsequent policies of George W. Bush in the Middle East, particularly the Iraq War unpopular among Muslims. For example, only 7% of American Muslims voted for Bush in 2004. Muslim support was also the majority in favor of Barack Obama in 2008 and 2012 and Hillary Clinton in 2016. By 2018 only 10% of Muslims voted for the Republican Party despite being socially conservative.

According to initial exit polls, around 69% of Muslims supported Democrat Joe Biden in 2022, although it was a slight decrease from the 82% who supported Hillary Clinton four years prior, this despite the fact that many of President Donald Trump's measures were unpopular with Muslims, such as the ban on the entry of immigrants from seven Islamic countries and the passage of the US embassy to Jerusalem. According to a survey conducted by ISPU, most Muslims that voted for Trump identified as White and exhibited significant amounts of anti-Muslim sentiment just as readily as non-Muslim Trump supporters. More extensive surveys later conducted by YouGov/CCES showed that nearly 84% of Muslims voted for Biden in 2020. Another survey conducted by Emgage/Muslim Public Affairs Council similarly showed a majority of Muslim voters (86%) backing Biden in the 2020 election.

The only Muslim representatives in the United States Congress are from the Democratic Party (as of 2021, no US Senators to date have been Muslim). See List of Muslim members of the United States Congress.

In Canada, the Muslim community votes overwhelmingly for the Liberal and New Democratic parties. In 2011 46% of Muslim Canadians had voted for the Liberals, with 38% for the NDP and only 12% for the Conservative. This support plummeted to 2% in 2015 when 65% of Muslims voted for the Liberal Party and 10% for the NPD.

Europe
A 2015 poll showed that 64% of British Muslims voted for the Labour Party, as opposed to 25% who voted Conservative. The Conservative Party has been accused of Islamophobic positions even by Prime Minister Boris Johnson. In 2017, 85% of Muslims voted for the Labour Party and only 11% for Conservatives. Notable figures in British politics who are Muslim include Mayor of London Sadiq Khan (Labour).

86% of French Muslims supported Socialist Party candidate François Hollande in 2012. The Muslim support for both Hollande and later Benoît Hamon alongside left-wing candidate Jean-Luc Mélenchon is also in the majority with only 15% supporting right-wing candidates. In the first round of the 2022 French presidential election, around 69% of French Muslims voted for left-wing candidate Jean-Luc Mélenchon. Notably, Mélenchon was the only major presidential candidate to consistently denounce Islamophobia and discrimination against Muslims.

In Germany a 2016 study by the Experts Council on Immigration and Integration found that the majority of Turks in Germany were aligned with the left-wing parties. The SDP had the backing of 41%, the CDU had 27%, the Greens 13%, The Left 13%, and others 7%. This contrasts with the non-Turkish population that supported the CDU/CSU 40%, the Social Democrats 27%, the Greens 13%, the Left 9%, and others 9%.

In the Netherlands, Muslims tended to vote for the Labour Party until recently. When three Muslim Members of Parliament quit the Labour Party in 2015 and founded the party Denk, the Labour Party saw a reduction on its support.

In Sweden, around 70-75% of Swedish Muslims are estimated to support the Social Democrats, whilst 10-15% support other parties of the red–green alliance.

Asia and Oceania
Indian Muslims tend to vote more frequently for the center-left Indian National Congress and its allies, with 43% of support as of 2019. The biggest support came from Assam with 99% of Muslims voting for the INC, and the smallest from West Bengal where it was 15%. Only 8% of Muslims voted for the right-wing Bharatiya Janata Party in 2019, though it was 1% more than in the last election.

In Israel, most Arab parties are classified as left-leaning. Of the Joint List, the major coalition of Arab parties, its members are classified as left-wing; Balad, Hadash and Ta'al with former member United Arab List being described as big tent, with some socially conservative and Islamist factions. In 2015, The Joint List received 82% of Arab Israeli support followed by social democratic Zionist Union with 22% and Likud with 15%.

In Australia, Muslims tend to vote for the centre-left Labor Party. Younger generations of Australian Muslims tend to also vote for the smaller left-wing parties, notable the Greens.

See also
 Islamo-leftism
 Islamic socialism
 Christian left
 Jewish left

References 

Liberal and progressive movements within Islam
Islam in Europe
Islam in the United States